Events in the year 2013 in Norway.

Incumbents
 Monarch – Harald V
 President of the Storting – Dag Terje Andersen (Labour) until 9 October, then Olemic Thommessen (Conservative) from 16 October
 Prime Minister – Jens Stoltenberg (Labour until 16 October, then Erna Solberg (Conservative from 16 October

Events

January
 16–19 January – Five Norwegians died in the In Amenas hostage crisis.
 17 January – A lorry full of highly-flammable goat-whey cheese, brunost, caught fire in a road tunnel near Narvik. The high fat and sugar content kept the conflagration burning for four days and the tunnel was impassable and badly damaged.

February
 19 February – The Standing Committee on Scrutiny and Constitutional Affairs unanimously criticised Stoltenberg's Cabinet for lack of security arrangement before the 2011 Norway attacks.

March

April

May
 6 May – Gerd Kristiansen was elected leader of the Norwegian Confederation of Trade Unions
 28 May – Oslo city council decided to build a new Munch Museum in Bjørvika.

June

July
 1 July – It was announced that the Södra Cell Tofte pulp mill will close.
 17 July – Marte Dalelv was convicted for extramarital sex and perjury after having reported a man to the police in Dubai for rape. She was later pardoned.

August
 5 August – A female employee at the Labour and Welfare Service in Oslo was stabbed at work and died five days later.
 17 August – The Hardanger Bridge was opened.

September
 9 September – In the 2013 Norwegian parliamentary election the non-socialist parties won a plurality. The Green Party gained a representative in parliament for the first time.
 9 September – Fifty-five percent of voters in Oslo voted in favour of the Oslo bid for the 2022 Winter Olympics.
 30 September – After negotiations, the Conservative Party and the Progress Party agreed to form a new cabinet while the Liberal Party and Christian Democratic Party agreed to support the cabinet in Parliament.

October
 7 October – The Conservative and Progress parties presented a political platform for Solberg's Cabinet.
 9 October – Olemic Thommessen formally becomes the new President of the Storting.
 16 October – Erna Solberg became as prime minister at her cabinet; the Progress party were represented in government for the first time following the 2013 parliamentary elections and Stoltenberg's lost the election.
 23 October – The Supreme Court ruled that a time limit of 25 years for individual fishing quotas does not violate the Constitution of Norway.

November
 4 November – Three people died in a hijacking of the Valdresekspressen bus service.
 16 November – Cyclone Hilde struck Trøndelag and Helgeland.

December
 3 December – PISA 2012 showed Norwegian pupils scoring below average in mathematics, and generally worse than in 2009.
 5 December – Seven pioneer divers in the North sea won a case against Norway in the European Court of Human Rights for financial compensation for injuries.
 10 December – The Organisation for the Prohibition of Chemical Weapons was awarded the 2013 Nobel Peace Prize in Oslo.
 10 December – Joshua French was indicted for the murder of Tjostolv Moland.
 12 December – Hurricane Ivar struck Central Norway; 53,000 households lost electricity.
 24 December – A storm struck many areas of the country on Christmas Eve.

Sports and popular culture

Chess 
1 April: Magnus Carlsen won the 2013 Candidate tournament in Chess and became the challenger to Viswanathan Anand in the World Chess Championship in November 2013.
11 August – 2 September – The Chess World Cup 2013 was hosted in Tromsø.
9–22 November – Carlsen won the 2013 World Chess Championship match 6½–3½ against Anand, thus becoming the new world chess champion.

Music 

 Norway in the Eurovision Song Contest 2013
"The Fox (What Does the Fox Say?)", an electronic dance song and viral video by the comedy duo Ylvis, was the top trending video of 2013 on YouTube.
9 October – Ylvis performs their viral hit "The Fox (What Does the Fox Say?)" on Late Night with Jimmy Fallon.

Television

Anniversaries

 23 January – 200 years since the birth of Camilla Collett
 11 June – 100 years since general suffrage for women in Norway
 5 August – 200 years since the birth of Ivar Aasen
 12 December – 150 years since the birth of Edvard Munch.

Notable deaths

 2 January – Dag Lyseid, footballer and politician (b. 1954)
 3 January – Preben Munthe, economist (b. 1922)
 3 January – Lars T. Bjella, politician (b. 1922)
 4 January – Petter Fauchald, footballer (b. 1930)
 4 January – Nilmar Janbu, engineer (b. 1921)
 5 January – Trygve Goa, printmaker (b. 1925)
 7 January – Helge B. Andresen, businessperson (b. 1935)
 7 January – Birck Elgaaen, equestrian (b. 1917)
 8 January – Asbjørn Aarnes, literary historian (b. 1923)
 8 January – Ole A. Sæther, entomologist (b. 1936)
 14 January – Morten Mølster, guitarist (b. 1962)
 18 January – Borghild Niskin, alpine skier (b. 1924)
 18 January – Svein Magnus Håvarstein, sculptor (b. 1942)
 19 January – Viggo Hagstrøm, legal scholar (b. 1954)
 25 January – Aase Nordmo Løvberg, opera singer (b. 1923)
 25 January – Arne Berg, ice hockey player (b. 1931)
 26 January – Egon Weng, dancer and ballet coach (b. 1924)
 28 January – John Tandrevold, boxer (b. 1927)
 1 February – Dag Schjelderup-Ebbe, musicologist (b. 1926)
 2 February – Tarjei Rygnestad, physician (b. 1954)
 3 February – Reidar Hugsted, engineer (b. 1931)
 3 February – Kåre Syrstad, agrarian leader (b. 1939)
 5 February – Egil Hovland, composer (b. 1924)
 7 February – Nic Knudtzon, engineer (b. 1922)
 7 February – Per Tomter, mathematician (b. 1939)
 8 February – Knut Nesbø, musician, footballer and journalist (b. 1961)
 9 February – Kåre Valebrokk, media executive (b. 1940)
 11 February – Tore Hansen, singer (b. 1949)
 11 February – Villy Andresen, footballer (b. 1925)
 12 February – Bård Henriksen, speed skater (b. 1945)
 13 February – Per Blom, film director (b. 1946)
 16 February – Jan Dahm, resistance member (b. 1921)
 19 February – Eva Bergh, actress (b. 1926)
 20 February – Oddbjørn Hågård, politician (b. 1940)
 1 March – Margaret Johansen, novelist (b. 1923)
 2 March – Niels Hertzberg, sports official (b. )
 2 March – Bjørn Skau, politician (b. 1929)
 11 March – Harald Peterssen, painter (b. 1916)
 16 March – Trond Brænne, actor (b. 1953)
 16 March – Georg Rajka, dermatologist (born 1925)
 17 March – Svein Blindheim, military officer (b. 1916)
 18 March – Eivind Rølles, guitarist (b. 1959)
 19 March – Eyvind Fjeld Halvorsen, philologist (b. 1922)
 23 March – Aloysius Valente, dancer (b. 1926)
 24 March – Inge Lønning, theologian and politician (b. 1938)
 24 March – Jo Inge Bjørnebye, ski jumper (b. 1946)
 25 March – Ellen Einan, poet (b. 1931)
 27 March – Hjalmar Andersen, speed skater (b. 1923)
 1 April – Eskild Jensen, civil servant (b. 1925)
 2 April – Johnny Lunde, alpine skier (b. 1923)
 3 April – Jul Haganæs, poet (b. 1932)
 3 April – Kiki Byrne, fashion designer (b. 1937, died in the UK)
 13 April – Hilmar Myhra, ski jumper (b. 1915)
 17 April – Yngve Moe, musician (b. 1957)
 18 April – Jon Åker, hospital director (b. 1927)
 21 April – Bjarne Sandemose, inventor (b. 1924)
 21 April – Sigurd G. Helle, topographer (b. 1920)
 21 April – Ludvig Johan Bakkevig, missionary (b. 1921)
 23 April – Tor Traheim, ship-owner (b. 1925)
 25 April – Tor Waaler, pharmacologist (b. 1927)
 28 April – Carl M. Rynning-Tønnesen, police chief (b. 1924)
 29 April – Erling Løseth, politician (b. 1927)
 29 April – Ole K. Sara, politician (b. 1936)
 29 April – Gunvor Stornes, writer (b. 1924)
 3 May – Thor Andreassen, trade unionist (b. 1927)
 4 May – Annok Sarri Nordrå, writer (b. 1931)
 5 May – Leif Preus, photographer (b. 1928)
 5 May – Arne Ratchje, aquaculturist (b. 1916)
 5 May – Tore Magnussen, boxer (b. 1938)
 10 May – Per Maurseth, historian (b. 1932)
 10 May – Jan H. Jensen, pulp writer (b. 1944, died in the Philippines)
 12 May – Olaf B. Bjørnstad, ski jumper (b. 1931)
 12 May – Helga Syrrist, politician and activist (b. 1921)
 16 May – Kristen Kyrre Bremer, bishop (b. 1925)
 17 May – Otto Julius Rosenkrantz Kloumann, officer and physician (b. 1916)
 18 May – Jo Benkow, politician (b. 1924)
 19 May – Anders Vangen, opera singer (b. 1960)
 25 May – Jan Kinder, ice hockey player (b. 1944)
 25 May – Erling Welle-Strand, resistance member (b. 1916)
 1 June – Atle Kittang, literary historian (b. 1941)
 1 June – Arnvid Førde, politician (b. 1919)
 2 June – Sverre Magelssen, YMCA leader (b. 1918)
 8 June – Per Edvard Danielsen, naval officer (b. 1918)
 9 June – Leif Karl Lundesgaard, military officer (b. 1922)
 13 June – Olav Sigurd Carlsen, politician (b. 1930)
 16 June – Tore O. Vorren, geologist (b. 1944)
 20 June – Per Ung, sculptor (b. 1933)
 29 June – Jørgen Sønstebø, politician (b. 1922)
 1 July – Rolf Nordhagen, physicist (b. 1927)
 1 July – Rolf Graf, musician (b. 1960)
 5 July – Tor Holtan-Hartwig, politician (b. 1927)
 7 July – Ingebjørg Wærstad, politician (b. 1926)
 9 July – Johannes Østtveit, politician (b. 1927)
 13 July – Mona Røkke, politician (b. 1940)
 15 July – Terje Mørkved, footballer and speed skater (b. 1949)
 15 July – Doris Jørns, writer (b. 1915)
 16 July – Torbjørn Falkanger, ski jumper (b. 1927)
 18 July – Ivar P. Enge, radiologist (b. 1922)
 18 July – Kåre Lunden, historian (b. 1930)
 18 July – Mary Eide, politician (b. 1940)
 19 July – Niclas Gulbrandsen, artist (b. 1930)
 24 July – Arne Eriksen, footballer (b. 1918)
 29 July – Ole Henrik Moe, museum director (b. 1920)
1 August – Arild Borgen, novelist (b. 1932).
 2 August – Ola Enstad, sculptor (b. 1942)
 6 August – Flora McDonald Hartveit, professor of medicine (b. 1931)
 9 August – Kristian Smidt, literary historian (b. 1916)
 17 August – Kjell Lund, architect (b. 1927)
 17 August – Alf Magne Austad, painter (b. 1946)
 18 August – Tjostolv Moland, mercenary (b. 1981, died in DR Congo)
 18 August – Rolv Wesenlund, comedian (b. 1936)
 21 August – Olav Hagen, cross-country skier (b. 1921)
 23 August – Kåre Kvilhaug, architect (b. 1925)
 24 August – Alf Kaartvedt, historian (b. 1921)
 27 August – Lucy Smith, law professor (b. 1934)
 27 August – Magnhild Holmberg, politician (b. 1943)
 29 August – Are Vesterlid, architect (b. 1921)
 29 August – Trond Kristoffersen, businessperson (b. 1956)
 30 August – Oddvar Vormeland, educationalist (b. 1924)
 4 September – Inge Paulsen, footballer (b. 1923)
 8 September – Tore Sinding-Larsen, judge (b. 1929)
 9 September – Gunnar Høst Sjøwall, tennis player (b. 1929)
 14 September – Amund Venger, politician (b. 1943)
 16 September – Odd Nordhaug, sociologist (b. 1953)
 17 September – Alex Naumik, rock and pop singer (b. 1949)
 18 September – Torleiv Anda, diplomat (b. 1921)
 19 September – Sven Josef Cyvin, chemist (b. 1931)
 19 September – Øystein Fischer, physicist (b. 1942)
 21 September – Albert Assev, family therapist (b. 1922)
 22 September – Hassan Abdi Dhuhulow, terrorist (b. 1990)
 23 September – Eivinn Berg, diplomat (b. 1931)
 23 September – Kirsten Sørlie, theatre instructor (b. 1926)
 24 September – Sverre Bruland, conductor (b. 1923)
 24 September – Frank Stubb Micaelsen, poet and novelist (b. 1947).
 25 September – Hans Guttorm, politician (b. 1927)
 26 September – Arnstein Johansen, accordionist (b. 1925)
 26 September – Helge Solvang, politician (b. 1913)
 1 October – Ole Danbolt Mjøs, physician and politician (b. 1939)
 1 October – Bjørn Randby, handballer and businessperson (b. 1931)
 2 October – Kaare Ørnung, pianist (b. 1931)
 11 October – Rolf Wembstad, footballer (b. 1927)
11 October – Olaf Heitkøtter, nature writer (b. 1928)
 12 October – Hans Wilhelm Longva, diplomat (b. 1942)
 18 October – Ola Syrstad, agriculturalist (b. 1922)
 19 October – Lage Fosheim, musician (b. 1958)
 21 October – Karen Sogn, politician (b. 1931)
 22 October – Jo Filseth, businessperson (b. 1937)
 23 October – Bjørn Christoffersen, rower (b. 1926)
 25 October – Dan Laksov, mathematician (b. 1940)
 25 October – Arne Johansen, speed skater (b. 1927)
 28 October – Trygve Kornelius Fjetland, businessperson (b. 1926)
 2 November – Målfrid Grude Flekkøy, Children Ombudsman (b. 1936) 
 2 November – Brita Borge, politician (b. 1931)
 4 November – Håkon Barfod, yacht racer (b. 1926)
 4 November – Astri Jacobsen, actress (b. 1922)
 6 November – Arvid Johanson, politician (b. 1929)
 7 November – Gunnar Hjeltnes, alpine skier (b. 1922)
 9 November – Helen Aareskjold, blind people's activist (b. 1938)
 9 November – Grethe Rytter Hasle, planktologist (b. 1920)
 9 November – Per Olsen, cross-country skier (b. 1932)
 11 November – Stein Grieg Halvorsen, actor (b. 1909)
 12 November – Erik Augestad, handballer (b. 1951)
 12 November – Tore Lindseth, footballer (b. 1948)
 16 November – Arne Pedersen, footballer (b. 1931)
 16 November – Erik Loe, editor (b. 1920)
 16 November – Tor Schaug-Pettersen, physicist (b. 1928)
 18 November – Knut Tøraasen, diplomat (b. 1938)
 18 November – Edgar Falch, footballer (b. 1930)
 21 November – Fred Kavli, entrepreneur (b. 1927, died in the US)
 23 November – Solveig Muren Sanden, illustrator (b. 1918)
 28 November – Elisabet Fidjestøl, politician (b. 1922)
 3 December – Anne Lorentzen, singer and media researcher (b. 1963)
 15 December – Frank Meidell Falch, cultural director (b. 1920)
 15 December – Viking Mestad, jurist (b. 1930)
 19 December – Hans Kvalbein, theologian (b. 1942)
 21 December – Egil Storeide, painter and film set decorator (b. 1940)
 22 December – David Kvebæk, family therapist (b. 1933)
 22 December – Frank Bjerkholt, writer (b. 1927)
 23 December – Bjarne Kortsen, musicologist (b. 1930)
 24 December – Jakob Sigurd Holmgard, politician (b. 1929)
 27 December – Gunn Olsen, politician (b. 1952)
 30 December – Haakon Sandberg, film director and producer (b. 1924)

Full date missing
Helge Andersen, author and playwright
Elisabeth Thams, translator and novelist
Kurt Valner, songwriter

See also
 2013 in Norwegian music

References